Langeria is an extinct genus of flowering plants in the family Platanaceae containing the solitary species Langeria magnifica. Langeria is known from fossil leaves found in the early Eocene deposits of northern Washington state, United States and similar aged formations in British Columbia, Canada.

Distribution
Langeria magnifica has been identified from a series of locations ranging from the Klondike Mountain Formation near Republic, Washington north. At least three locations in British Columbia have Langeria fossils, including the Coldwater Beds Quilchena locality near Merritt, the Tranquille Formations McAbee Fossil Beds near Kamloops, and the Chu Chua Formations Joseph Creek site near Chu Chua. Generally speaking, the age for the locations is Early Eocene, with the sites that have current uranium–lead or argon–argon radiometric dates being of Ypresian age, while the undated sites and sites with less current dating being possibly slightly younger and Lutetian in age.

History and classification
Langeria magnifica was described from a series of type specimens, the actual holotype specimen being UW 39713, in the paleobotanical collections of Burke Museum, University of Washington, and its counterpart being UCMP 9273, currently preserved in the University of California Museum of Paleontology. An additional eight leaves from both the Burke Museum and UC Museum of Paleontology were designated paratypes specimens. Working from those specimens, collected in the Republic, Washington area in the early 1980s, the fossils were studied by Jack A. Wolfe of the University of California and Wesley C. Wehr of the Burke Museum. They published their 1987 type description for the genus and species in a United States Geological Survey monograph on the North Eastern Washington dicot fossils. The genus name Langeria is a matronym honoring the American philosopher of mind, Susanne K. Langer, who influenced the analysis and organization of scientific data. The specific epithet magnifica would imply "magnificently large". Wolfe and Wehr note that the extinct species "Fortunearia" weedi is distinctly similar to Langeria magnifica and might turn out to be congeneric.

When first described, L. magnifica was placed in the family Hamamelidaceae, commonly known as the witch-hazel family, by Wolfe and Wehr.  This placement was later questioned and the genus was subsequently reclassified by Indah Huegele and Steven Manchester (2022) as a member of the plane tree family Platanaceae.

Description
The simple leaves of Langeria magnifica are generally pinnate in venation with an overall ovate to elliptical shape and an apex that is notably pointed. The petiole can reach lengths of up to  The margin of the leaf has evenly spaced, distinct hook-shaped teeth with rounded sinuses separating them. The teeth are entered by a secondary vein or by a veinlet from the loop of a secondary vein. The primary vein has between ten and twelve secondary veins diverging from it at low angles toward the apex and getting higher in angle towards the base.

References

†
Prehistoric angiosperm genera
Ypresian plants of North America
Monotypic Saxifragales genera
Extinct flora of North America
Coldwater Beds
Chu Chua Formation
Klondike Mountain Formation
Tranquille Formation